The Union for Homeland and Progress (UPP) was a political party in Benin.

History
The UPP was established in 1996 and joined the Suru Alliance to contest the 1999 parliamentary elections, alongside the Union for Democracy and National Reconstruction, the Forum for Democracy, Development and Morality and the National Forum of Civil and Civic Awakening. The alliance received 1.5% of the vote, winning a single seat taken by the UPP's Gado Girigissou.

References

Defunct political parties in Benin
Political parties established in 1996